Furkan Korkmaz (born 24 July 1997) is a Turkish professional basketball player for the Philadelphia 76ers of the National Basketball Association (NBA). He was born and raised in Istanbul, and was selected 26th in the 2016 NBA draft.

Early years
Korkmaz was born in Bakırköy, Istanbul. He started playing basketball with the school team when he was nine. In 2012, he moved to Anadolu Efes, from Efes' junior team, Yeşilyurt Spor Kulübü, for $250,000, at the age of 15.

Professional career

Anadolu Efes (2013–2017)
In his first year in the Efes club infrastructure, Korkmaz played for the junior and youth teams of Efes. He was loaned for the 2013–14 season to the Turkish 2nd-tier level TB2L team Pertevniyal, which was at the time the farm club of Anadolu Efes. In the summer of 2014, Korkmaz moved to the senior men's Anadolu Efes first team. His contract with Efes included a $2 million buyout clause for the NBA.

On June 13, 2016, Korkmaz was one of 13 different international underclassmen to enter the 2016 NBA draft.  He was selected 26th in the first round, by the Philadelphia 76ers. After being drafted, Korkmaz decided to return to Anadolu Efes for at least another season.

Banvit (2016–2017)
On December 2016, Korkmaz was loaned by Anadolu Efes to Banvit. In February 2017, he won the Turkish Cup with Banvit, which was the first trophy in the club's history. In the same season, Korkmaz was the inaugural winner of the Basketball Champions League (BCL) Best Young Player award of the 2016–17 season of the European-wide third tier level. In the BCL, he reached the championship game of the competition with Banvit, where his team lost 63–59 to Iberostar Tenerife. Korkmaz recorded 4 points and 2 rebounds in the final game.

Philadelphia 76ers (2017–present)
On July 4, 2017, Korkmaz signed with the Philadelphia 76ers. During his rookie season, he received multiple assignments to the Delaware 87ers of the NBA G League.

In Philadelphia's first game of the 2018 NBA Summer League, Korkmaz scored 40 points (including 8 three-pointers) in 28 minutes during an 89–95 loss to the Boston Celtics. It was the fifth-best scoring performance in Summer League history.

After not seeing much playing time, Korkmaz requested a trade from the 76ers in November 2018. However, he ultimately stayed with the team On December 10, Korkmaz scored 18 points off the bench in a win over the Detroit Pistons. On December 12, he had his first career start in place of the injured Jimmy Butler.

On July 25, 2019, Korkmaz re-signed with the 76ers on a two-year contract. Throughout the season, he has made his way in and out the starting lineup, playing both shooting guard and small forward. On November 2, Korkmaz hit the game-winner against the Portland Trail Blazers. On February 7, 2020, Korkmaz scored a career-high, 34 points off the bench, against the Memphis Grizzlies. One game later, Korkmaz went off again, scoring 31 points off the bench against the Chicago Bulls. Korkmaz started 12 games, and averaged a career-high 21.7 minutes a game, and established career high averages in points and rebounds per game at 9.8 and 2.3, respectively, while shooting a career-high 40.2% in three-point field goal percentage.

In the 2020 season, Korkmaz had 11 starts in the abbreviated season, and scored 9.1 points per game, along with 2.1 rebounds per game and 37.5% three-point shooting. He had career highs in assists and steals per game, at 1.5 and .9, respectively. In the playoffs, Korkmaz made four starts in the conference semi-finals against the Atlanta Hawks when Danny Green was injured, ending his season.

On August 9, 2021, Korkmaz re-signed with the 76ers on a three-year contract.

On February 2023, Korkmaz requested a trade from the 76ers for the second time during his stint with the team.

National team career

Junior national team
Korkmaz was a member of the junior national teams of Turkey. With Turkey's junior national teams, he played at: the 2013 FIBA Europe Under-16 Championship, which he led in scoring,  the 2014 FIBA Europe Under-18 Championship, where he won a gold medal, the 2015 FIBA Europe Under-18 Championship, where he won a silver medal and was named to the All-Tournament Team, and at the 2015 FIBA Under-19 World Cup, where he won a bronze medal and was named to the All-Tournament Team.

He also played at the 2017 FIBA Europe Under-20 Championship, where he averaged 12.8 points, 4.6 rebounds, 4.8 assists, 2.6 steals, and 0.2 blocks per game, in 30.3 minutes per game. At the 2017 Under-20 tournament, he also shot 35.6% overall from the field, 27.6% from three-point range, and 66.7% from free throw range.

Senior national team
Korkmaz played with the senior men's Turkish national basketball team at the EuroBasket 2015, and at the 2016 Manila FIBA World Olympic Qualifying Tournament. He also played at EuroBasket 2017.

Honors

Club honors
Senior club honors
Turkish Cup Winner: 2015, 2017
Turkish Supercup Winner: 2015

Turkish junior national team
2014 FIBA Europe Under-18 Championship: 
2015 FIBA Europe Under-18 Championship: 
2015 FIBA Under-19 World Cup:

Individual
2013 FIBA Europe Under-16 Championship: Top Scorer
2015 FIBA Europe Under-18 Championship: All Tournament Team
2015 FIBA Under-19 World Cup: All Tournament Team
Champions League Best Young Player: 2016–17

Career statistics

NBA

Regular season 

|-
| style="text-align:left;"| 
| style="text-align:left;"| Philadelphia
| 14 || 0 || 5.7 || .286 || .294 || .500 || .8 || .3 || .1 || .1 || 1.6
|-
| style="text-align:left;"| 
| style="text-align:left;"| Philadelphia
| 48 || 7 || 14.1 || .400 || .326 || .818 || 2.2 || 1.1 || .6  || .0 || 5.8
|-
| style="text-align:left;"| 
| style="text-align:left;"| Philadelphia
| 72 || 12 || 21.7 || .430 || .402 || .755 || 2.3 || 1.1 || .6  || .2 || 9.8
|-
| style="text-align:left;"| 
| style="text-align:left;"| Philadelphia
| 55 || 11 || 19.3 || .401 || .375 || .732 || 2.1 || 1.5 || .9 || .2 || 9.1
|-
| style="text-align:left;"| 
| style="text-align:left;"| Philadelphia
| 67 || 19 || 21.1 || .387 || .289 || .810 || 2.6 || 1.9 || .5 || .1 || 7.6
|- class="sortbottom"
| style="text-align:center;" colspan="2"| Career
| 256 || 49 || 18.7 || .405 || .355 || .769 || 2.2 || 1.3 || .6 || .1 || 7.9

Playoffs 

|-
| style="text-align:left;"| 2018
| style="text-align:left;"| Philadelphia
| 1 || 0 || 1.6 || 1.000 || 1.000 || — || .0 || .0 || .0 || .0 || 3.0
|-
| style="text-align:left;"| 2019
| style="text-align:left;"| Philadelphia
| 4 || 0 || 8.9 || .333 || .375 || .800 || 1.5 || 1.3 || .0 || .3 || 4.8
|-
| style="text-align:left;"| 2020
| style="text-align:left;"| Philadelphia
| 4 || 0 || 10.1 || .000 || .000 || .600 || 1.5 || .5 || .3 || .0 || .8
|-
| style="text-align:left;"| 2021
| style="text-align:left;"| Philadelphia
| 12 || 4 || 16.2 || .411 || .318 || .714 || 2.0 || .6 || .6 || .3 || 7.0
|-
| style="text-align:left;"| 2022
| style="text-align:left;"| Philadelphia
| 9 || 0 || 6.8 || .478 || .400 || 1.000 || 1.3 || .4 || .1 || .1 || 3.1
|- class"sortbottom"
| style="text-align:center;" colspan="2"| Career
| 30 || 4 || 11.1 || .393 || .319 || .731 || 1.6 || .6 || .3 || .2 || 4.6

EuroLeague

|-
| style="text-align:left;"| 2014–15
| style="text-align:left;" rowspan="3"|Anadolu Efes
| 19 || 1 || 10.7 || .408 || .414 || .789 || 1.4 || .8 || .6 || .2 || 3.5 || 3.8
|-
| style="text-align:left;"| 2015–16
| 19 || 5 || 8.8 || .391 || .423 || .571 || 0.9 || .5 || .1 || .2 || 2.7 || 1.4
|-
| style="text-align:left;"| 2016–17
| 2 || 0 || 7.0 || .200 || .000 || .000 || 0.5 || .5 || 1.5 || .0 || 1.0 || 1.5
|- class="sortbottom"
| style="text-align:center;" colspan="2"| Career
| 40 || 6 || 9.6 || .390 || .411 || .731 || 1.1 || .7 || .4 || .1 || 3.0 || 2.6

References

External links

Furkan Korkmaz at draftexpress.com
Furkan Korkmaz at eurobasket.com
Furkan Korkmaz at euroleague.net
Furkan Korkmaz at fiba.com (archive)
Furkan Korkmaz at fibaeurope.com
Furkan Korkmaz at tblstat.net

1997 births
Living people
2019 FIBA Basketball World Cup players
Anadolu Efes S.K. players
Bandırma B.İ.K. players
Delaware 87ers players
National Basketball Association players from Turkey
People from Bakırköy
Pertevniyal S.K. players
Philadelphia 76ers draft picks
Philadelphia 76ers players
Shooting guards
Small forwards
Basketball players from Istanbul
Turkish expatriate basketball people in the United States
Turkish men's basketball players
21st-century Turkish people